You Prefecture or Youzhou (Chinese: Yòuzhōu 宥州;) was a prefecture (zhou) of imperial China in what is now southern Inner Mongolia. It existed intermittently from 738 until the early 13th century.

History
You Prefecture was briefly occupied by the Tibetan Empire in the 9th century. From the 10th to 12th centuries, it was mostly controlled by the Tanguts as part of the Dingnan Jiedushi or the Western Xia. The Western Xia were destroyed by the Mongolian Empire in 1227.

Geography
The administrative region of Youzhou during the Tang dynasty is in modern southern Inner Mongolia. It probably includes parts of modern: 
 Under the administration of Ordos City:
 Otog Banner
 Otog Front Banner
 Under the administration of Wuhai:
 Wuhai

See also
 You Prefecture in Beijing

References
 

Prefectures of the Tang dynasty
Prefectures of the Song dynasty
Prefectures of Western Xia
Former prefectures in Inner Mongolia